Microsconsia is a genus of medium-sized sea snails, marinegastropod mollusks in the family Cassidae, the helmet snails and bonnet snails.

Species
Species within the genus Microsconsia include:

 Microsconsia limpusi Beu, 2008

References

Cassidae